Asad Ullah Khan Pathan is an Indian cricketer. He currently plays for Railways, previously played for Gujarat, played t10 in Dubai, played six games in IPL for  Royal Challengers Bangalore

References

Living people
1984 births
Indian cricketers
Gujarat cricketers
Railways cricketers
Royal Challengers Bangalore cricketers